The 2004–05 season was Port Vale's 93rd season of football in the English Football League, and first in the newly created League One. Martin Foyle's first full season in charge, Vale survived a relegation dogfight to finish in eighteenth place, having struggled to compete with the departures of Stephen McPhee and Steve Brooker. His side exited both the FA Cup and the League Trophy at the Second Round, and left the League Cup at the First Round.

Overview

League One
The pre-season saw Martin Foyle add to his squad with a number of free signings: Lee Matthews (Bristol City); Jeff Smith (Bolton Wanderers); Dean Smith (Sheffield Wednesday); Daryl McMahon (West Ham United); and Robin Hulbert (Telford United). The pre-season saw Vale finish 5th in the Isle of Man tournament at The Bowl. They also managed to battle to a draw at home to La Liga outfit Racing de Santander.

The season started positively with ten points from five games, though until the end of the season Vale failed to find form, and picked up an average of one point a game despite only playing in five draws all season. At half-time at the opening game of the season at Vale Park, fans were surprised to hear an announcement over the public address system telling them not to sing songs deriding rivals Stoke City. Mark Goodlad picked up an injury, allowing Jonny Brain the chance to impress between the sticks. At the end of September, star midfielder Steve Brooker was sold to Bristol City for £225,000. The club failed to bring in Christian Roberts in return, though Marc Goodfellow was signed on a four-week loan deal the following month. Teenage defender James O'Connor also joined on loan from Aston Villa. In November, Andreas Lipa returned to his homeland to play for Austria Lustenau, after Foyle released the injury-plagued defender. McMahon also left the club to join Leyton Orient. Foyle brought a new signing to Vale Park though, with striker Nathan Lowndes joining on a free transfer from Plymouth Argyle. In December, defender Tyrone Loran joined on a one-month loan from Tranmere Rovers, though returned to Prenton Park when the loan deal was up, after Foyle failed to sign him permanently. Christian Hanson was also signed from non-league Billingham Synthonia. Foyle also signed Nigerian defender George Abbey, who had been released by Macclesfield Town. In January, Dean Smith retired as a player and took up coaching at Leyton Orient. As a replacement, former Vale player Tommy Widdrington joined until the end of the season on non-contract terms. In February, veteran midfielder Danny Sonner joined on a one-month loan from Peterborough United. In March, club legend and former teammate of Foyle, Tony Naylor, joined on an emergency short-term contract, though never took to the field. Tony Dinning also was signed on loan from Bristol City. In addition to this, Mark Innes joined on a free transfer from Chesterfield. Sonner's loan deal was also extended until the end of the season, at which point he was signed permanently, as was Dinning. Vale lost to fellow relegation strugglers Torquay United and Wrexham in the last five games of the season, though a 5–0 win over Barnsley ensured the club's safety from the drop.

They finished in eighteenth place with 56 points, leaving them five points clear of relegated Torquay. Their 59 goals conceded was a highly respectable tally, however they failed to score in almost half of their league games, and only recorded five draws all season. Vale lost more games and scored fewer goals than all club's in the division other than Peterborough United and Stockport County, who were both cut adrift early in the season. Billy Paynter was the club's top-scorer with thirteen goals, with other contributions also coming from Lee Matthews and Chris Birchall.

At the end of the season teenage prodigy David Hibbert was snapped up by Preston North End, who paid Vale £35,000 after a tribunal. Four players were also released: Simon Eldershaw (Northwich Victoria); Christian Hanson (Billingham Synthonia); Levi Reid (Stafford Rangers); and Ryan Brown (Leek Town). Ian Armstrong also retired due to injury.

Finances
On the financial front, Chairman Bill Bratt announced there was a 50-50 chance that an elderly American would put funds into the club, though the investment did not come through. Bratt also went public with his idea of Reginald Mitchell Stadium in honour of the inventor of the Spitfire, hopeful that 85-year-old American billionaire Sidney Frank would thus be encouraged to invest in the club. Foyle was desperate for more funds to attract better players, and was forced to dismiss speculation that he would sell Billy Paynter to Crewe Alexandra. On 13 December, shareholders voted by a margin of 119 to 3 to limit individual holdings in the club to a maximum of 24.9% "to ensure that no single shareholder can acquire undue influence or control over the company", in the words of Bill Bratt. The club's shirt sponsorship came from mobile phone company Tricell, though the firm could not afford to pay the club any money as they entered administration, worsening an already bleak financial picture for the "Valiants".

Cup competitions
In the FA Cup, Vale avoided embarrassment by coming from behind to defeat local side Kidderminster Harriers 3–1. They then lost out to Blackpool in the Second Round with a 1–0 defeat at Bloomfield Road.

In the League Cup, Vale travelled to Belle Vue, where they were knocked out by Doncaster Rovers after a 3–1 defeat.

In the League Trophy, the "Valiants" advanced past Barnsley in front of a Vale Park crowd of just 1,970. However they then exited at the Second Round after a 2–1 defeat to Tranmere Rovers at Prenton Park.

League table

Results
Port Vale's score comes first

Football League One

Results by matchday

Matches

FA Cup

League Cup

League Trophy

Player statistics

Appearances

Top scorers

Transfers

Transfers in

Transfers out

Loans in

References
Specific

General
Soccerbase

Port Vale F.C. seasons
Port Vale